Your House Helper is a 2018 South Korean television series based on a webcomic of the same title which was first published in 2014 by KTOON and lasted on the said platform for three seasons. The series stars Ha Seok-jin, Bona, Lee Ji-hoon, Ko Won-hee, Jeon Soo-jin and Seo Eun-ah. It aired on KBS2's Wednesdays and Thursdays at 22:00 (KST) time slot from July 4 to August 29, 2018.

Synopsis
A man, who works as a house helper, helps arrange people's homes, lives and relationships.

Cast

Main
 Ha Seok-jin as Kim Ji-woon, a man from a prominent family who ends up working as a housekeeper.
 Bona as Im Da-young, an ambitious intern at an advertising company who tries to become a full-time employee and inherited both a house and debt from her father.
 Lee Ji-hoon as Kwon Jin-kook, a skilled lawyer with a wealthy background.
 Ko Won-hee as Yoon Sang-ah, a jewelry designer.
 Jeon Soo-jin as Kang Hye-joo, an accessory seller who has a complicated relationship with her boyfriend.
 Seo Eun-ah as Han So-mi, a nail shop owner who is scared of men after going through a traumatic event in the past.

Supporting

People around Ji-woon
 Jo Hee-bong as Go Tae-soo
 Yeon Joon-seok as Park Ga-ram

People around Da-young
 Yoon Joo-sang as Jang Yong-geon
 Jeong Suk-yong as Da-young's Team Leader
 Lee Min-young as Ahn Jin-hong 
 Im Ji-kyu as Oh Yoon-gi
 Kim Min-seok as Seo Ho-gi
 Song Sang-eun as Baek Jang-mi
 Inoa as Choi Na-ri

Others
 Lee Do-gyeom as Bang Cheol-su
 Yeon Joon-seok as Park Ga-Ram
 Kim Seon-ho as Yong-joon (cameo)

Production
The first script reading of the cast was held on May 21, 2018 at KBS Annex Broadcasting Station in Yeouido.

Original soundtrack

Part 1

Part 2

Part 3

Part 4

Part 5

Part 6

Ratings

Awards and nominations

Notes

References

External links
  
 
 
 

Korean Broadcasting System television dramas
Korean-language television shows
2018 South Korean television series debuts
2018 South Korean television series endings
South Korean romantic comedy television series
Television shows based on South Korean webtoons